Audioweb are an English indie rock band, formed in 1991 in Manchester. They were initially called The Sugar Merchants.

Career
Audioweb scored two Top 40 hits in the UK Singles Chart - "Policeman Skank...(The Story Of My Life)", and a cover version of The Clash's "Bankrobber". Famous admirers of the group were U2 and Ian Brown. Audioweb supported U2 at Wembley Stadium in August 1997. Prior to this Stadium gig they supported Cast at Glasgow's Barrowlands in March 1997. They also supported Madness at Madstock '96 at Finsbury Park, London. Audioweb released their material on the Mother Records label.

The band split up in 1999. Bassist McCann played for Ian Brown and Badly Drawn Boy and releases his own music under the name Fellow Traveller; Maxfield has drummed for Ian Brown since 2001; File has been working with the singer-songwriter Finley Quaye; while Merchant's 2007 - 2013 Manchester band, SupaJamma have released one mini album "That Was Then, This is Now" & four singles, "Madaboutit, It's Alright, Hope & Pray, We Run Tings" on Stereokill Recordings.  Merchant is also the vocalist on the theme tune for the BBC show Rastamouse.

Audioweb reformed in 2016.  The band's first live performance after reforming was on 18 June 2016 at Manchester City F.C.'s Etihad Stadium, supporting The Stone Roses. The reformation was derailed in September 2017 when frontman Martin Merchant was charged with three counts of possession of a firearm and one count of possession of ammunition, and sentenced at Manchester Magistrates’ Court.

Nevertheless, a new single, "King", was released in 2021.

Personnel

Martin "Sugar" Merchant (vocals)
Sean McCann (bass)
Robin File (guitar)
Robert "Maxi" Maxfield (drums)

Discography

Albums
 Audioweb (1996) UK No. 70
 Fireworks City (1998)

Singles
 "Sleeper" (1995) UK No. 74
 "Yeah?" (1996) UK No. 73
 "Into my World" (1996) UK No. 42 US No. 10
 "Sleeper" (remix) (1996) UK No. 50
 "Bankrobber" (1997) UK No. 19
 "Faker" (1997) UK No. 70
 "Policeman Skank... (The Story of My Life)" (1998) UK No. 21
 "Personal Feeling" (1998) UK No. 65
 "Get Out of Here" (1998)
 "Test the Theory" (1999) UK No. 56
 "King" (2021)

References

External links
Republic of Audioweb – unofficial Audioweb fansite
Fellow Traveller 
Republic of Audioweb – MySpace page
'SupaJamma' Martin Merchants new band- MySpace page

English rock music groups
English electronic music groups
Musical groups from Manchester
Musical groups established in 1991
Musical groups disestablished in 1999
1991 establishments in England